The 2018 Texas Roadhouse 200 was the 20th stock car race of the 2018 NASCAR Camping World Truck Series, the first race of the Round of 6, and the 16th iteration of the event. The race was held on Saturday, October 27, 2018, in Martinsville, Virginia at Martinsville Speedway, a  permanent oval-shaped short track. The race took the scheduled 200 laps to complete. At race's end, Johnny Sauter of GMS Racing would dominate the race to win his 23rd career NASCAR Camping World Truck Series win and his sixth and final of the season to lock himself into the Championship 4. To fill out the podium, Brett Moffitt of Hattori Racing Enterprises and Myatt Snider of ThorSport Racing would finish second and third, respectively.

Background 

Martinsville Speedway is an NASCAR-owned stock car racing track located in Henry County, in Ridgeway, Virginia, just to the south of Martinsville. At 0.526 miles (0.847 km) in length, it is the shortest track in the NASCAR Cup Series. The track was also one of the first paved oval tracks in NASCAR, being built in 1947 by H. Clay Earles. It is also the only remaining race track that has been on the NASCAR circuit from its beginning in 1948.

Entry list

Practice 
Originally, there were going to be two scheduled 50-minute practice sessions on Friday, October 26. However, rain would cancel both sessions.

Qualifying 
Qualifying was held on Saturday, October 27, at 10:05 AM EST. Since Martinsville Speedway under , the qualifying system was a multi-car system that included three rounds. The first round was 15 minutes, where every driver would be able to set a lap within the 15 minutes. Then, the second round would consist of the fastest 24 cars in Round 1, and drivers would have 10 minutes to set a lap. Round 3 consisted of the fastest 12 drivers from Round 2, and the drivers would have 5 minutes to set a time. Whoever was fastest in Round 3 would win the pole.

Three drivers would fail to qualify: Norm Benning, Ray Ciccarelli, and Landon Huffman.

Full qualifying results

Race results 
Stage 1 Laps: 50

Stage 2 Laps: 50

Stage 3 Laps: 100

References 

2018 NASCAR Camping World Truck Series
NASCAR races at Martinsville Speedway
October 2018 sports events in the United States
2018 in sports in Virginia